Dyckia rariflora is a plant species in the genus Dyckia endemic to the State of Minas Gerais in Brazil.

Cultivars
 Dyckia 'Yakuza'

References

rariflora
Endemic flora of Brazil
Plants described in 1830